The New Haven Road Race is a 20 kilometer road race held in New Haven, Connecticut which was started in 1978. The race is held during the Labor Day weekend.

History 
The first year the race was contested was in 1978, when nearly 1,200 runners showed up. The race director convinced the reigning marathon world champion, Bill Rodgers, to headline the race. The record number of competitors was in 2013, when over 7,000 people ran. As of 2021, there are 8 competitors who have run the race every year since its inauguration.

Many years, the race has been host to the USATF 20k championships. During these years, elite athlete coordination is provided exclusively to domestic athletes, to incentivize American citizens to compete.

Most years, the prize purse is around $40,000, with various incentives for breaking records. Money is paid out 10 deep.

From the races inauguration to 1985, there was no presenting sponsor. From 1985 to 1989, American National Bank was the main sponsor. In 2003, New Haven Savings Bank was the main sponsor. In 2004 and 2005 NewAlliance Foundation was the primary sponsor. Since 2007, Faxon Law Group has been the presenting sponsor.

Results 
Key:

References 

Long-distance running competitions
Sports in New Haven, Connecticut
Road running competitions in the United States